Jason Flowers (born 30 January 1975), also known by the nickname of "Collie",  is a professional rugby league footballer who played in the 1990s and 2000s, and has coached in the 2010s.

Playing career

International honours
Jason Flowers won 2 caps (plus 1 as substitute) for Scotland in 1998–2001 while at Castleford.

Club career
Jason Flowers was transferred from Redhill ARLFC to Castleford on Wednesday 12 May 1993.

References

External links
Jason Flowers Memory Box Search at archive.castigersheritage.com

1975 births
Living people
Castleford Tigers players
English people of Scottish descent
English rugby league players
Halifax R.L.F.C. players
Place of birth missing (living people)
Rugby league centres
Rugby league fullbacks
Rugby league second-rows
Rugby league utility players
Rugby league wingers
Salford Red Devils players
Scotland national rugby league team players